Media in Jammu and Kashmir (JK) consists of media houses such as Kashmir Times, Greater Kashmir, Rising Kashmir and Daily Excelsior and digital news outlets like Free Press Kashmir, The Chenab Times, The Kashmir Walla and radio stations such as AIR Srinagar, AIR Jammu, Radio Mirchi 98.3 FM, Red FM 93.5 and Radio Sharda. DD Kashir is state television broadcaster. Major private channels are News18 Urdu and Gulistan News. Various books have been written about the region, a large number being related to the Literature of Kashmir, Culture of Kashmir, Lal Ded and Nund Rishi. Koshur, Dogri, Punjabi, Pahari, Gojri, Hindi-Urdu and English are the main languages used.

Periodicals 
Major periodicals in Jammu and Kashmir include Greater Kashmir, Rising Kashmir, Kashmir Times,  Daily Excelsior, Elite Kashmir and Kashmir Monitor.

News Agencies of Kashmir
Kashmir News observer (KNO),  Kashmir News Bureau (KNB) Current News Service (CNS), Kashmir News Service (KNS) and Asian News International. A Press Council of India report in 2017 titled "Media and Media Scenario of J&K" in 2017 stated that newspapers and periodical approved by the government of Jammu and Kashmir in which government-sponsored advertisements are released is 467, with 146 of them being on the DAVP panel.

Cinema and music

Kashmiri cinema and Dogri cinema are major film and music industries in Jammu and Kashmir. Music companies like KDMJAMMU, Music Tape Industry (MTI) Studios, Jammu and Kashmir Academy of Art, Culture and Languages (JKAACL) and T-Series Kashmiri Music  promote traditional Kashmiri folk music like Chakri, Henzae, Wanvun, Ladishah, Bacha Nagma, Dumhal, Dogri Bhakh, Gojri music and top singers like Raj Begum, Vibha Saraf, Qazi Touqeer, Shameem Dev Azad, Nargis Khatoon Bushra & Uzma (twins), Mehmeet Syed, Sakeena Reshi, Pragaash, Shabnam Naz, Shameema Akhtar, Sheela Zargar, Shazia Bashir, Zahida Taranum, MC Kash. During the Kashmir conflict following 1989, cinema halls were closed. Kashmiri militants said that films in movie halls were "un-islamic" while the Indian Army used movie halls as garrisons. In 1999 attempts were made to reopen the movie halls, but after a series of attacks, soon they were shut again. The movie hall "Neelam" has been used by the CRPF till as recent as July 2018. During the "Kashmir World Film Festival" in 2017, Naeem Akhtar, a Kashmiri politician, talked about reopening of the cinema halls. Kashmir's first multiplex is under construction as of June 2020 while Jammu division has multiple multiplexes. Several multiplex cinemas are:
 MovieTime Cinemas in Palm Island Mall, Jammu.
 PVR Cinemas, KC Jammu.
 Wave Cinemas, Jammu.
 Apsara Multiplex, Jammu
 AMR Multiplex, Katra
 Moonlight Cineplex, Kathua
 Raj Theatre, Udhampur

Radio 

Radio stations in Jammu and Kashmir include "AIR Srinagar", "AIR Jammu" and "Radio Sharda". Radio Jammu Kashmir was the first broadcasting centre of Jammu and Kashmir, coming into existence on 1 December 1947. Radio Sharda, a worldwide community radio service for Kashmiri Pandits, was started by Ramesh Hangloo. FM Tadka 95.0, 
BIG FM 92.7, Radio Mirchi and Red FM 93.5 are private FM radio stations in Jammu city and Srinagar.

Television

DD Kashir is major television channel of J&K UT. Most watched kashmiri programme was Kus Bani Koshur Karorpaet. Popular private television channels are News18 Urdu and Gulistan News.

Books 

Writers produce books "documenting everything (in Jammu and Kashmir) from folklore to political happenings, to the sufferings of people". A number of young writers are seen. Yayavar is annual Literary Festival of Jammu Division. Gulshan Books is the only bookshop-library on a lake in Jammu and Kashmir. Famous dogri writers are Jitendra Udhampuri and Champa Sharma while kashmiri writers are Mahjoor, Zareef Ahmad Zareef, Amin Kamil, Ghulam Nabi Gowhar, Shahnaz Bashir, Ghulam Rasool Nazki, Z. G. Muhammad and Ghulam Nabi Firaq.

Media issues in Jammu and Kashmir 
19 journalists have been killed in Jammu and Kashmir since 1990. The region has seen various prohibitive measures against the media.

Media coverage of the Kashmir conflict 

A study by Chindu Sreedharan concluded the dominance of "anti-peace news" in the overall coverage of Kashmir suggesting that the press in India and Pakistan has a counterproductive role in the Kashmir issue and that the "coverage was vigorously government-led and intensely 'negative'". A study in the Pakistan Journal of History and Culture found that newspapers of both countries (India and Pakistan) were "setting the agenda on Kashmir issue positively in the light of foreign policy of their respective country".

A Reuters Institute Fellowship paper titled "Media Propaganda and the Kashmir Dispute: A Case Study of the Kashmir Floods" based on an analysis of the New Delhi-based media’s coverage of the 2014 floods in Kashmir, the study concludes that "its reporting was biased and subjective". Almost all the coverage focused on the rescue efforts of the Indian armed forces. while the contribution made by local volunteers in providing relief was. The paper established that The Times of India devoted 57% of its coverage "specifically to the army’s relief efforts" while NDTV focused 97% of its content "on the army and government’s role in the crisis".

Attacks on journalists in the Kashmir conflict 
Since 1990, the total number of journalists who have been killed in Jammu and Kashmir is 19.

The first major killing in Jammu and Kashmir by militants was of Lassa Kaul, the Director of Srinagar Doordarshan in February 1990, outside his house in Bemina. This was followed by the killing of P.N. Handoo of the State Information Department. Militant and terrorist groups also "imposed a ban on the distribution of national newspapers and Kashmir Times and Daily Excelsior, both published in English from Jammu". Ghulam Muhammad Lone and his eight year old son were killed in 1994 by gunmen. On 10 August 2000, a grenade killed seven journalists including Pradeep Bhatia, a journalist from Hindustan Times. Asiya Jeelani, a print reporter, died after a van in a landmine blast in Kupwara. The most recent killing of a journalist, Shujaat Bukhari, happened in June 2018.

To counter the Pakistani misinformation campaign the Indian central government allocated Rs 430 crore for upgrading and improving Doordarshan and All India Radio for Jammu and Kashmir in 2004.

Media censorship 

In 2016, newspaper publications were banned for three days in Kashmir.

On 24 August 2017, the Ministry of Electronics and Information Technology sent a letter to Twitter under Section 69A of the IT Act to censor content. Following this Twitter users received official legal complaints from Twitter.

A Press Council of India report in 2017 titled "Media and Media Scenario of J&K" in 2017 states that “journalists in Kashmir have to manage the reality of walking on the tightrope amidst the threats of gun and political arm-twisting”. Security forces consider photojournalists as "instigating protestors", while the protestors call them "government agents".

Laxmi Murthy and Geeta Seshu of Network of Women in Media, India (NWMI), in their 2019 report titled, 'News behind the barbed wire", based on field observation after the abrogation of Article 370 of the Indian Constitution, which provided special status to the erstwhile state of J&K, expressed that,  "in the absence of reportage from the ground, the government’s influence of the narrative of normalcy is near total. Its official proclamations of the creation of a ‘Naya Kashmir’ have become vociferous. In contrast, there is a deafening silence and invisibilisation of voices from Kashmir expressing alienation, anger and disillusionment at perceived breach of trust. The government’s control of communication processes is intrinsically undemocratic and harmful, as it privileges the voices of authority and weakens those who speak truth to power."

The Media Policy 2020 of the Jammu and Kashmir has also been criticised for allegedly "monopolising the flow of information by the state". Press Council of India was particularly alarmed by the provisions of 'fake news' in the media policy, which it said, while taking suo-moto cognisance of the matter, "interferes with the free functioning of the press."

New Media Censorship through frequent Internet bans

Internet shutdowns are quite frequent in Jammu and Kashmir. The conflict-ridden region of Jammu and Kashmir in India saw five internet shutdowns until February 2021. In 2020, this number was 115. Since 2012, the region has been subject to 300 internet shutdowns, highest in the country.

In 2019, Internet was also suspended all across Jammu and Kashmir ahead of the revocation of Article 370. While the ban on internet wasn't lifted in the Kashmir valley, internet was completely restored in Ladakh. In Jammu the broadband was restored while the high-speed mobile internet services continued to remain suspended.

With the Centre refusing to lift the gag on internet services  journalists in Kashmir valley  had no option but to wait their turn at the media facilitation centre set up especially for them.  Even then, Winter’s first snowfall in Srinagar cost journalists in Kashmir one of their most essential means of connecting with the rest of the world as the internet  stopped working due to a fibre cut in the lease line at the media facilitation centre in Kashmir Valley.

The Jammu and Kashmir government finally  restored 4G mobile Internet services in entire J&K after one and a half year in February, 2021.

Arrest of journalists 
Kamran Yusuf, a freelance Kashmiri photojournalist, was arrested by the National Investigation Agency (NIA) on 5 September 2017 and was released on bail on 14 March 2018. During this time, he was lodged in the Tihar Jail, New Delhi. The bail petition was opposed by the NIA. In an earlier case, Dawn reported that on 19 August 2011, Showkat Shafi, a freelance photojournalist was "beaten by government forces" and then taken to the nearest police station. After his release, he had to be hospitalised.

Assault on Kashmiri Journalists

The two video journalists, Qayoom Khan and Qisar Mir, who were working for CNN-News 18 and TV9 were allegedly stopped by the police on March 4 in Pulwama. Their camera and two mobile phones were also taken away and returned to them after almost five hours.

On 26 May 2020 Umer Rashid, a Journalist from District Shopian and his colleague was beaten by police near Newa area of South Kashmir's Pulwama when they were returning from their Srinagar Office  the move was widely condemned by journalists and civil society members

See also 
 Ocean of Tears

References

Further reading 

 Viswam, Deepa (2010), Role of Media in Kashmir Crisis, Kalpaz Publications, 
 Showkat, Nayeem (2017), "Kashmir in media: An overview", International Journal of Advanced Research and Development. 
 Arora, V P S & Singh, Manoj Kumar. The role of media in promoting human rights a comparative study of Jammu Kashmir and Chhattisgarh. Archived from the original on 3 February 2018.
Sreedharan, Chindu (March 2009). Reporting Kashmir: An analysis of the conflict coverage in Indian and Pakistani newspapers, Bournemouth University thesis submission, archived from the original on 10 August 2017.

Mass media in Jammu and Kashmir